Keith Alexander may refer to:
 Keith Alexander (footballer) (1956–2010), former English footballer and football manager
 Keith B. Alexander (born 1951), retired U.S. Army general and former head of the National Security Agency
 Keith Alexander (Manitoba politician) (1921–1972), Progressive Conservative politician in Manitoba, Canada
 Keith Alexander (racing driver) (born 1963), American racecar driver
 Keith Alexander (guitarist) (1963–2005), former guitarist of 1980s thrash band Carnivore
 Keith Alexander (actor) (fl. 1966), British actor and voice actor
 Keith Alexander (engineer), New Zealand inventor and professor of mechanical engineering at the University of Canterbury
 Keith Alexander, a co-host of The Political Cesspool

See also
 Alexander Keith (disambiguation)